Jassi Sidhu (born 1978, Birmingham, United Kingdom) is a British-Indian Bhangra singer and the former lead singer of bhangra band B21. He split from the group, declaring that they would "never, ever reconcile" and that "(B21 was) nothing more than a glorified mime act", quoting differences between himself and Bally Jagpal.

He has released five solo albums to date. Reality check in 2003, No Strings Attached in 2005, The New Adventures of Jassi Sidhu in 2008, Singing Between The Lines in 2011 & Coleshill Road in 2014.

Sidhu was born and raised in Birmingham, West Midlands, England, and has a blossoming solo career, having toured many countries since going solo from the US to the Far East. He is an avid Liverpool F.C. fan.

Since departing from B21, Jassi Sidhu has released four solo albums and one greatest hits album. His debut album titled Reality Check was released in 2003, and contained ten brand new songs. This release landed him a place in India, it was the first step for him to cement his name as a solo act. The album contained seven songs and three remixes. His second album called No Strings Attached was released in 2005, and also contained 10 new songs. This time Sidhu created a rock ballet type of song called honkeh. The album was fairly successful and boosted his reputation as a solo artist. The greatest hits album was filled with eight songs. Sidhu had redone three of the songs, "0Chandigarh", "Din Raat" and "Bhabi". The other five songs had the same music but saw Sidhu resigning them. Jassi Sidhus latest offering was called Ke Kehne and was released in 2008. This album has ten new songs and two remixes and saw Sidhu team up with "MBE" Malkit Singh. Jassi Sidhu also teams up with producer and friend Rishi Rich, as well as the man behind the hits "Tharti Hilde" and "Sher Punjabi", Aman Hayer.In April 2009, Jassi Sidhu released, Jassi What Happened?, an album comprising all his hits in live version recorded in the studio. It also came with a bonus DVD.Singing Between The Lines, featuring the single "Oh Jatta", was released for Digital Download on iTunes on 18 May 2011 and the CD released a week later. He appeared on the Breakdown Bhangra show in May 2011 on the BBC Asian Network and publicly declared that this would be his last album although he did not rule out singing occasional songs on other artists album. The reason he gave was that he wanted to quit the Bhangra industry after almost 20 years and try something new. In 2013, he released his song "Hipshaker" featuring Lilly Singh. In 2014, he released his song, "Singh" with Vanjhali Records. In 2020, he announced he will release a new album, titled The Trilogy. The album will feature 3 songs and will now be released in 2021. He released the song "Kudi Chandigarh Di" in March 2021, his first song since 2014.

Discography

Film Songs
Chandigarh Kare Aashiqui (2021) - Title Track (composed by Sachin-Jigar), Title Track 2.0 (composed by Tanishk Bagchi)

Singles

See also 

 List of British Sikhs

References

Bhangra (music) musicians
Desi musicians
Indian male singers
English Sikhs
Musicians from Birmingham, West Midlands
1978 births
Living people